Trunk Line Bridge No. 1, also known as Peshekee River Bridge, is a bridge adjacent to US Highway 41/M-28 (US 41/M-28). It was the first of many trunkline bridges designed by the Michigan State Highway Department.  It was built in 1914, and listed on the National Register of Historic Places in 1999.

Description
The bridge used to carry US 41/M-28 across the Pesheskee River near the river's mouth at Lake Michigamme. It is located between a Soo Line Railroad (ex-Duluth, South Shore and Atlantic Railway) bridge to the south and the modern replacement bridge to the north.

This carries a concrete deck and full-height abutments over solid concrete piers with bullnosed cutwaters. The girder walls feature rectangular recessed panels capped by concrete copings.

History
Today, drivers cannot use the Peshekee River Bridge south of US 41/M-28 in western Marquette County's Michigamme Township, although access can be had on foot from the eastern side. The bridge is under the supervision of the Michigan State Parks with the Department of Natural Resources (DNR) and is part of the Van Riper State Park. The bridge was built in 1914 in response to the 1913 State Trunk Line Act passed by the Michigan Legislature. The act further said that the Michigan State Highway Department would design, build and maintain trunkline bridges spanning  or more so long as the local governments improved an adjacent  of roads. Marquette County built a mainline road from Marquette west to Michigamme near the county line, including an improved  section in 1913 to encourage the state to build the bridge. The bridge was designed by C.V. Dewart for the department and built by the local firm of Powell and Mitchell in Marquette. The Peshekee River Bridge would later be incorporated into the routing of US 41 in the 1920s.

The bridge was listed on the National Register of Historic Places in 1999 as "Trunk Line Bridge No. 1" for its engineering and architectural significance. MDOT has listed it as "one of Michigan's most important vehicular bridges." It was the first bridge designed by the Michigan State Highway Department, the forerunner to MDOT, in 1914. The original bridge was abandoned as a roadway when a second crossing was built. The second crossing was bypassed and demolished during the construction of the current highway bridge over the Peshekee River on US 41/M-28 in late 1995.

See also

 List of bridges on the National Register of Historic Places in Michigan
 National Register of Historic Places listings in Marquette County, Michigan

Notes

References

Road bridges on the National Register of Historic Places in Michigan
Bridges completed in 1914
U.S. Route 41
National Register of Historic Places in Marquette County, Michigan
Girder bridges in the United States
M-28 (Michigan highway)
Concrete bridges in the United States
Buildings and structures in Marquette County, Michigan